"Greedy People" is a song by Australian psychedelic rock group, Electric Hippies. It was released in May 1994 as the second single from the group's debut studio album The Electric Hippies. The song peaked at number 29 on the Australian ARIA Charts.

At the ARIA Music Awards of 1995, the song was nominated for ARIA Award for Best Video.

Track listing
CD single (rooArt 4509950542)
 "Greedy People" - 2:41
 "Little Miss Star" - 2:59
 "Letter of Apology" - 3:18
 "I'm Leaving (Reprise)" - 3:03 (German bonus track)

Charts

References

1993 songs
1994 singles
Electric Hippies songs
Songs written by Steve Balbi
Songs written by Justin Stanley